Daryl Bamonte is an English musician, music publisher, record label head and artist manager, known for working for Depeche Mode and the Cure. He is the owner of Archangelo Music, an Ambassador for Europe in Synch, a consultant for Schubert Music Europe  and the keyboardist in Permafrost.

Depeche Mode
He started off, as documented in an interview with authors Dennis Burmeister & Sascha Lange for the Depeche Mode book 'Monument',  setting up and taking down equipment for the band in their early days. He stayed with them, after they gained success, as the road manager. He is also credited in the commentary of the film  Depeche Mode 101, as the fifth member of Depeche Mode. He is seen in many parts of the film, including one in which he sings "I Saw Her Standing There" accompanied by Dave Gahan on harmonica and Martin Gore on guitar. He was the tour manager for the Depeche Mode: Devotional video documentary.

Bamonte was an assistant on the Violator album, the Project Manager on the Songs Of Faith And Devotion album  and an album co-ordinator for Songs Of Faith And Devotion Live 

In 1994, Andrew Fletcher had to leave the tour ill and Daryl replaced him for the second leg of the US Tour, as well as six shows in South America.

Alan Wilder commented on his website when asked about this:
"While everyone else was sunning themselves on the beach and enjoying a well-earned rest, Daryl and I spent a week cooped up in a hotel room in Hawaii where I taught him the entire set. He subsequently played it perfectly for the rest of the tour - pretty good eh, considering he'd hardly ever played a keyboard before in his life."

Having been with them since the beginning of their career, he appears in all of the documentaries for the Depeche Mode remastered albums released so far, apart from Exciter and later, as he stopped working with the band in 1995.

The Cure
After having previously toured with The Cure in the mid-1980s, Daryl began working with the band again in 1995 alongside his older brother Perry Bamonte, the band's lead guitarist at the time. Daryl was a project coordinator for the Bloodflowers album, the Join the Dots box set, and a number of remastered album reissues. He also served as the executive producer for their Trilogy DVD and the band's 2004 self-titled album alongside Robert Smith. His work with the Cure ended in 2005.

Compact Space
Bamonte was one of three members in the band Compact Space, along with Christian Eigner and Florian Kraemmer. In the band, Bamonte wrote the lyrics, Eigner wrote the music, and Kraemmer assembled the melodies. Their first album Nameless and the Push Push EP were released in June 2011 in physical and digital formats through their own label Elsbeere Recordings in a worldwide licensing deal with Ferryhouse Productions in Hamburg.

Schubert Music Publishing 
Bamonte is a consultant for Schubert Music Europe and the head of the Atlantic Curve record label.  Since forming in 2020, Atlantic Curve has released albums by critically-acclaimed artists such as I Like Trains, Laura Carbone and the Burn album by Lisa Gerrard & Jules Maxwell from Dead Can Dance, which was produced by James Chapman from  Maps (musician). During his time as Managing Director of Schubert Music Publishing UK , Bamonte signed an eclectic list of artists including Polly Scattergood, Vita & The Woolf and Sheila Simmenes.

Executive Producer 

Bamonte was an Executive Producer for The Cure's live Trilogy film from 2003,  and their self-titled album from 2004. He fulfilled the same role for Roger O'Donnell's 2 Ravens album, Lisa Gerrard & Jules Maxwell's Burn album  and Maxwell's Nocturnes album, which Bamonte released on his newly-formed Archangelo Recordings label in 2021. In 2022, he was Executive Producer for "Exaudia"  a collaborative album from Lisa Gerrard and Marcello De Francisci. Bamonte is still very active as an artist manager, and also as a speaker at international conferences and consulting contributor to workshops and seminars.

Archangelo Music 

Bamonte formed Archangelo Music  in 2021 to release Jules Maxwell's Nocturnes album  on the Archangelo Recordings label. The album received great praise from some of Maxwell's contemporaries such as  Roger O'Donnell  from The Cure, Lisa Gerrard & Brendan Perry from Dead Can Dance, James Chapman from MAPS and Foy Vance. Archangelo Music  also includes Archangelo Songs. Bamonte has signed a worldwide sub-publishing deal with BMG  and has already signed his first copyrights from Roger O'Donnell, Jules Maxwell and James Chapman with more to follow soon. As well as Archangelo Recordings, Bamonte has also formed an additional label -  Bamala Newtown.

Europe in Synch 
Bamonte is also an ambassador for the newly-formed Europe in Synch organisation

Permafrost 

Permafrost is a post-punk band, originally from Molde in Norway, which was formed in 1982 by school friends Frode Heggdal Larsen & Kåre Steinsbu. Robert Heggdal & Trond Tornes joined in 2001 and Bamonte in 2016. They take their name from a song by Magazine and other influences are Joy Division, The Cure, Talking Heads, Pere Ubu, Yello, Fad Gadget, The Residents, Wire and Wolfgang Press.

To date they have released the ‘Godtment’ EP (on a limited edition of 50 numbered cassettes) in 1983, the ‘Permafrost’ EP (on vinyl only)  in 2019 and in 2021 released three "unstoppable singles", "Femme Fatale", "Closed Eyes" and "Restore Us"   which all went to number 1 on the Indie Disko Top40 Chart. The Permafrost EP was subsequently released on all digital platforms on 15th October 2021 on their own Fear of Music label.   In February 2022, their single "Come Back To Surprise" reached Number 3 on the Deutsche Alternative Chart  and Number 5 on the Indie Disko Top40 Chart.  Their first album is expected in 2023.

References

Year of birth missing (living people)
English rock musicians
English keyboardists
Living people
English people of Italian descent
Depeche Mode
The Cure